Martin Sus may refer to:

 Martin Sus (footballer, born 1989), Czech footballer for FC Zbrojovka Brno
 Martin Sus (footballer, born 1990), Czech footballer for Baník Ostrava